Caltoris philippina, the Philippine swift, is a butterfly belonging to the family Hesperiidae.

Description

Subspecies
C. p. philippina Sri Lanka, India, Malay Peninsula, Nias, Palawan, Philippines, Sulawesi, Talaud, Sangihe, Sula
C. p. subfenestrata   (Röber, 1891)   New Guinea, Solomon Islands

References

Caltoris
Lepidoptera of the Philippines
Butterflies of Indochina
Butterflies of Asia
Butterflies of Singapore